Krishna I (reign 756–774 CE), an uncle of Dantidurga, took charge of the growing Rashtrakuta Empire by defeating the last Badami Chalukya ruler Kirtivarman II in 757. This is known from the copper plate grant of Emperor Govinda III of 807 and a copper plate grant of the Gujarat Rashtrakuta Emperor Karka from Baroda. He is also known as Kannara or Kannesvara and took the titles Akalavarsha, Shubatunga, Prithvivallabha and Shrivallabha. He patronised the famous Jain logician Akalanka Bhatta, the author of Rajavartika.

Some historians are of the opinion that Krishna I usurped the throne from his nephew Dantidurga. But others disagree as the term "demise of Dantidurga" occur in the Kavi and Navasari copper plates indicating Krishna I must have ascended the throne after the death of Dantidurga. However, from the Baroda inscription it seems that Krishna I may have had to subdue another claimant to the throne, perhaps a Rashtrakuta prince or a son of Dantidurga. 

He successfully fought the Western Ganga Dynasty King Sripurusha (and acquired some territory in Gangavadi, modern Southern Karnataka) and the Shilaharas of South Konkan. He defeated the Eastern Chalukya ruler Vishnuvardhana IV. He was responsible for building 18 Shiva temples. The Kailasa temple at Ellora is generally attributed to him, based on certain epigraphs.

His eldest son, Govinda II came to power after him.

References

Bibliography

 

774 deaths
Hindu monarchs
Rashtrakuta dynasty
8th-century Indian monarchs